Arthur Robert MacKenzie (June 26, 1873 – February 10, 1963) was a Canadian politician. He served in the Legislative Assembly of New Brunswick as member of the Conservative party representing St. Stephen-Milltown from 1926 to 1930.

References

20th-century Canadian politicians
1873 births
1963 deaths
Progressive Conservative Party of New Brunswick MLAs